The Florida Power and Light Company Ice Plant (also known as the City Products Corporation Ice Plant or locally as the Ice Plant) is a historic site in Melbourne, Florida, United States. It is located at 1604 South Harbor City Boulevard. On November 17, 1982, it was added to the U.S. National Register of Historic Places.

Construction on the plant began in December 1926 after the approval of a permit; it was completed in the spring of 1927. The original estimated cost was $30,000, but the final construction cost has been listed at $100,000. The plant, which had an ice capacity of 50 tons at its peak, ceased operation in 1977.

At various times, proposals have been made to redevelop the building as a restaurant, offices, or residential space.

References

 Brevard County listings at National Register of Historic Places
 Brevard County listings at Florida's Office of Cultural and Historical Programs

Buildings and structures in Melbourne, Florida
NextEra Energy
National Register of Historic Places in Brevard County, Florida
Ice trade
1927 establishments in Florida
Industrial buildings completed in 1927